Elections to Southend-on-Sea Borough Council took place on 2 May 2019. This was on the same day as other local elections across the United Kingdom.

The election led to the majority Conservative administration being replaced by a "rainbow coalition" between the Independents, Labour and the Liberal Democrats, which was voted in by a vote of 27-20.

Composition
Directly after the 2018 election the composition of the council was:

Prior to the election the composition of the council was:

After the election, the composition of the council was:

Result summary

Results

Belfairs

Blenheim Park

No UKIP candidate as previous (−4.1).

Chalkwell Ward

Eastwood Park

Kursaal

Leigh

Milton 

Results compared to the 21 March 2019 Milton by-election.

Green party compared to 2018 election, no For Britain candidate (−5.3) as previous.

Prittlewell

Shoeburyness 

Green candidate compared to 2016 election

Swing and majority compared to independent victory in 2018

Southchurch 

UKIP candidate compared to 2016 election.

St. Laurence 

UKIP and Green candidate compared to 2016 election.

St. Luke's 

No Psychedelic Future (−1.8) candidate as previous

Thorpe 

Green party compared to 2016 election.

Victoria 

UKIP and liberal democrat candidates compared to 2016 election.

West Leigh 

Green party candidate compared to 2016 election.

West Shoebury 

Green candidate compared to 2016 election.

Westborough

Notes

References

2019
2019 English local elections
May 2019 events in the United Kingdom
2010s in Essex